Sakatar Singh (born 1986) is an Indian football player. He is currently playing for Mohun Bagan AC in the I-League as a midfielder.

External links
 Interview in Mohun Bagan Official Website
 http://goal.com/en-india/people/india/21209/sakatar-singh
 http://www.indianfootball.com/en/statistic/player/detail/playerId/210

Indian footballers
1986 births
Living people
Footballers from Punjab, India
Association football midfielders
Mohun Bagan AC players